The Srinagar Highway (previously known as the Kashmir Highway) is a major east-west highway in Islamabad, Capital Territory, Pakistan. The highway provides quick access through Islamabad and connects the Islamabad International Airport in the west to the E-75 Expressway in the east. The total length of the highway is 25 kilometers. The width varies from three lanes to five lanes and has 5 interchanges.

Interchanges and exits

See also 

 Faizabad Interchange
 Seventh Avenue (Islamabad)
 Developments in Islamabad

References

External links 
 Capital Development Authority
 Islamabad Administration

Highways in Islamabad Capital Territory